Trinidad and Tobago is an archipelagic republic in the southern Caribbean between the Caribbean Sea and the North Atlantic Ocean, northeast of Venezuela. They are southeasterly islands of the Lesser Antilles, Monos, Huevos, Gaspar Grande (or Gasparee), Little Tobago, and St. Giles Island. The island appears rectangular in shape with three projecting peninsular corners. The island is cigar-shaped in appearance, with a northeast–southwest alignment.

Physical geography

Trinidad is traversed by three distinct mountain ranges that are a continuation of the Venezuelan coastal cordillera. The Northern Range, an outlier of the Andes Mountains of Venezuela, consists of rugged hills that parallel the coast. This range rises into two peaks. The Caroni Plain, composed of alluvial sediment, extends southward, separating the Northern Range and Central Range.

Most of the soils of Trinidad are fertile, with the exception of the sandy and unstable terrain found in the southern part of the island.

There are deep, fertile valleys running north and south of the Main Ridge. The southwestern tip of the island has a coral platform. Although Tobago is volcanic in origin, there are no active volcanoes. Forestation covers 43% of the island. There are numerous rivers and streams, but flooding and erosion are less severe than in Trinidad. The coastline is indented with numerous bays, beaches, and narrow coastal plains.

Tobago has several small satellite islands.

Because it was once part of continental South America, Trinidad has an assortment of tropical vegetation and wildlife considerably more varied than that of most Caribbean islands. Tobago has a generally similar but less varied assortment.

Geology

Geologically, the islands are not part of the Lesser Antilles Volcanic Arc. Rather, Trinidad was once part of the South American mainland and is situated on its continental shelf, and Tobago is part of a sunken island arc chain related to the Pacific-derived Caribbean Plate. The islands are separated from the continent of South America by the Gulf of Paria; Bocas del Dragón, a -wide northern passage; and Serpent's Mouth, a -wide southern passage.

The Northern Range consists mainly of Upper Jurassic and Cretaceous metamorphic rocks. The Northern Lowlands (East–West Corridor and Caroni Plains) consist of younger shallow marine clastic sediments. South of this, the Central Range fold and thrust belt consists of Cretaceous and Eocene sedimentary rocks, with Miocene formations along the southern and eastern flanks. The Naparima Plains and the Nariva Swamp form the southern shoulder of this uplift.

The Southern Lowlands consist of Miocene and Pliocene sands, clays, and gravels. These overlie oil and natural gas deposits, especially north of the Los Bajos Fault. The Southern Range forms the third anticlinal uplift. It consists of several chains of hills, most famous being the Trinity Hills. The rocks consist of sandstones, shales, siltstones and clays formed in the Miocene and uplifted in the Pleistocene. Oil sands and mud volcanoes are especially common in this area.

Political geography

Trinidad is split into 14 regional corporations and municipalities, consisting of 9 regions and 5 municipalities, which have a limited level of autonomy. The various councils are made up of a mixture of elected and appointed members. Elections are due to be held every three years with the last elections held in 2019. The island of Tobago is administered by the Tobago House of Assembly.

Climate 

The country lies in the tropics, enjoying a generally pleasant maritime tropical climate influenced by the northeast trade winds. The highest temperature ever was 37.8 degrees Celsius. The humidity is high, particularly during the rainy season, when it averages 85 to 87%. During the dry season, drought plagues the island's central interior. Tobago's climate is similar to Trinidad's but slightly cooler. The islands lie outside the hurricane belt; despite this, Hurricane Flora damaged Tobago in 1963. The hurricane killed 18 people on Tobago and caused $30:million in crop and property damages (1963 USD). Tropical Storm Alma hit Trinidad in 1974, causing damage before reaching full strength. Wind gusts reached 91 mph (147 km/h) at the Savonette gas field during the storm.

Statistics

Area:total: 5,128 km2land: 5,128 km2water: negligible

Coastline: 362 km

Maritime claims:
contiguous zone: continental shelf:  or to the outer edge of the continental marginexclusive economic zone: territorial sea: 

Terrain: mostly plains with some hills and low mountains

Extreme points:

Northernmost point: Marble Island, Tobago

Southernmost point: Icacos, Siparia region, Trinidad Island

Westernmost point: Icacos, Siparia region, Trinidad Island

Easternmost point: Easternmost tip of Little Tobago, Tobago

Lowest point: Caribbean Sea 0 m

Highest point: El Cerro del Aripo, Trinidad 940 m

Natural resources:
petroleum, natural gas, asphalt

Land use:
arable land:
4.9%
permanent crops:
4.3%

permanent pasture: 1.4%

forest: 44%other: 45.4% (2018 est.)

Irrigated land:
70 km2 (2012)

Total renewable water resources:
3.84 billion m³ (2017)

See also
 Trinidad and Tobago dry forests
 Biota of Trinidad and Tobago
 List of rivers of Trinidad and Tobago
 List of islands of Trinidad and Tobago

References